2-Phenylethyl bromide is an organobromide with the formula C6H5CH2CH2Br.  It is a colorless liquid, although older samples appear yellow.  Analogous to the preparation of most 1-bromoalkanes, it is prepared by free-radical addition of hydrogen bromide to styrene.  These conditions lead to anti-Markovnikov addition, giving the 1-bromo derivatives.

Upon reaction with hydrazine, phenelzine is produced.

References

Organobromides